The following television stations broadcast on digital channel 41 in the United States:

 K41HQ-D in Quanah, Texas, to move to channel 24
 WFRW-LD in Enterprise, Alabama, to move to channel 14
 WFYW-LP in Waterville, Maine, to move to channel 35

The following stations, which are no longer licensed, formerly broadcast on digital channel 41:
 K41BW-D in New Mobeetie, Texas
 K41GI-D in Imlay, Nevada
 K41HH-D in Austin, Nevada
 K41JF-D in Hagerman, Idaho
 K41KZ-D in Chalfant Valley, California
 K41MX-D in Perryton, Texas
 KLMW-LD in Lufkin, Texas
 KMMA-CD in San Luis Obispo, California
 KQLP-LD in Lincoln, Nebraska
 KTJX-LD in College Station, Texas
 WIFR in Freeport, Illinois
 WRZY-LD in Buxton, North Carolina

References

41 digital